Monowar Hossain Chowdhury is a Bangladesh Awami League politician and the incumbent member of parliament for Gaibandha-4.

Career
Chowdhury participated at the 2008 and 2014 elections under the symbol 'nouka' of the current ruling party. He was elected to represent Gaibandha-4 in 2008 but failed in 2014. He was chief Engineer of LGED. He was elected to parliament from Gaibandha-4 as a Bangladesh Awami League candidate on 30 December 2018.

References

Awami League politicians
Living people
11th Jatiya Sangsad members
9th Jatiya Sangsad members
1948 births